HD 102350 is a single star in the constellation Centaurus. It has a yellow hue and is visible to the naked eye with an apparent visual magnitude of 4.11. The distance to this star is approximately 390 light years based on parallax, but it is drifting closer with a radial velocity of −3 km/s. It has an absolute magnitude of −1.51.

This is an aging bright giant star with a stellar classification of G0II. It is a candidate Cepheid variable, but Hipparcos photometry found its brightness to be constant. The star has expanded to 22 times the radius of the Sun and is radiating 283 times the Sun's luminosity from its enlarged photosphere at an effective temperature of 5,051 K. It has a magnitude 13.0 visual companion at an angular separation of  along a position angle of 313° relative to the brighter component, as of 2000.

References

G-type bright giants
Suspected variables
Centaurus (constellation)
CD-60 03741
102350
057439
4522